This is a list of Star Wars video games. Though there have been many hobbyist-made and freeware games based on the Star Wars movie series and brand, this page lists only the games that have been developed or published by LucasArts, or officially licensed by Lucasfilm.
Platforms: Arcade, Apple II, Atari 2600, Famicom, Nintendo Entertainment System, Super Nintendo Entertainment System, Nintendo 64, Sega Master System, Sega Dreamcast, Game Gear, GameCube, DOS, Microsoft Windows, Macintosh, Classic Mac OS, macOS, PlayStation, PlayStation 2, PlayStation 3, PlayStation 4, PlayStation 5, PlayStation Vita, Xbox, Xbox 360, Xbox One, Xbox Series X/S, Wii, Wii U, Game Boy, Game Boy Color, Game Boy Advance, Nintendo DS, PlayStation Portable, iOS, Android, Linux, Stadia.

Episode-related titles
The following is a list of Star Wars games that are based on the feature films. They are listed in order of release by film.

Episode IV: A New Hope
Star Wars (1983–88) – Arcade 
Re-released for: Atari 2600, Atari 5200, Commodore 64, Atari 8-bit family, ColecoVision, BBC Micro, ZX Spectrum, Acorn Electron, Amstrad CPC, Atari ST, Apple II, DOS, Macintosh, Amiga.
 Death Star Interceptor (1984/85, System 3 Software Ltd) (unlicensed) - Commodore 64, ZX Spectrum
Star Wars (1987) – Famicom
Star Wars: Attack on the Death Star (1991) – PC-9801, X68000
Star Wars (1991–93) – NES, Game Boy, Master System, Game Gear
Super Star Wars (1992) – SNES
Re-released for: Wii Virtual Console, PlayStation 4, PlayStation Vita
Star Wars Arcade (1993) – Arcade
Re-released for: 32X

Episode V: The Empire Strikes Back
Star Wars: The Empire Strikes Back (1982) – Atari 2600, Intellivision
Star Wars: The Empire Strikes Back (1985/88) – Arcade
Re-released for: BBC Micro, Commodore 64, ZX Spectrum, Amstrad CPC, Amiga, Atari ST.
Star Wars: The Empire Strikes Back (1992) – NES, Game Boy
Super Star Wars: The Empire Strikes Back (1993) – SNES
Re-released for: Wii Virtual Console

Episode VI: Return of the Jedi
Star Wars: Return of the Jedi – Death Star Battle (1983/84) – Atari 2600, Atari 8-bit family, Atari 5200, ZX Spectrum
Star Wars: Return of the Jedi (1984/88) – Arcade, BBC Micro, Commodore 64, ZX Spectrum, Amstrad CPC, Amiga, Atari ST, GameCube
Super Star Wars: Return of the Jedi (1994) – SNES, Game Boy, Game Gear
Re-released for: Wii Virtual Console

Episode I: The Phantom Menace
Star Wars: Episode I – The Phantom Menace (1999) – Microsoft Windows, PlayStation
Star Wars Episode I (1999) – Pinball
Star Wars Episode I: Racer (1999) – Windows, Mac, Dreamcast, Nintendo 64, Game Boy Color
Re-released for: Nintendo Switch (2020), PlayStation 4 (2020), Xbox One (2020)
Star Wars: Racer Arcade (2000) – Arcade
Star Wars Episode I: Jedi Power Battles (2000) – PlayStation, Dreamcast, Game Boy Advance
Star Wars Episode I: Battle for Naboo (2000) – Nintendo 64, Microsoft Windows
Star Wars Episode I: Obi-Wan's Adventures (2000) – Game Boy Color
Star Wars: Starfighter (2001) – PlayStation 2, Xbox, Windows, Arcade
Star Wars: Starfighter Special Edition (2001) Xbox
Star Wars: Starfighter (2003) Arcade
Star Wars: Obi-Wan (2001) – Xbox

Episode II: Attack of the Clones
Star Wars: Jedi Starfighter (2002) PlayStation 2, Xbox
Star Wars: The Clone Wars (2002) – GameCube, PlayStation 2, Xbox
Star Wars: Episode II – Attack of the Clones (2002) – Game Boy Advance
Star Wars: The New Droid Army (2002) – Game Boy Advance

Episode III: Revenge of the Sith
Star Wars: Episode III – Revenge of the Sith (2005) – PlayStation 2, Xbox, Nintendo DS, Game Boy Advance, Mobile Phone

Series titles
The following is a list of Star Wars games that are not based on a particular feature film, and form part of a series. The list is ordered from the oldest series to the latest.

X-Wing
Star Wars: X-Wing (1993) – DOS, Macintosh, Windows (X-Wing Collector Series)
Expansion(s): Imperial Pursuit (1993) and B-Wing (1993)
Compilations: X-Wing (Collector's CD-ROM) (1994), X-Wing Collector Series (1998)
Star Wars: TIE Fighter (1994) – DOS, Macintosh, Windows (X-Wing Collector Series)
Expansion(s): Defender of the Empire (1994) 
Compilations: TIE Fighter (Collector's CD-ROM) (1995), X-Wing Collector Series (1998)
Star Wars: X-Wing vs. TIE Fighter (1997) – Windows
Expansions: Balance of Power Campaigns (1997), and Flight School (1998)
Star Wars: X-Wing Alliance (1999) – Windows

Rebel Assault
 Star Wars: Rebel Assault (1993) DOS, Mac, Sega CD, 3DO
 Star Wars: Rebel Assault II: The Hidden Empire (1995) DOS, PlayStation, Microsoft Windows

Jedi Knight
Star Wars: Dark Forces (1995) DOS, Mac, PlayStation
Star Wars Jedi Knight: Dark Forces II (1997) Windows
Expansion(s): Star Wars Jedi Knight: Mysteries of the Sith (1998) Windows
Star Wars Jedi Knight II: Jedi Outcast (2002) Windows, Mac, Xbox, GameCube
Re-released for: Nintendo Switch (2019), PlayStation 4 (2019)
Star Wars Jedi Knight: Jedi Academy (2003) Windows, Mac, Xbox
Re-released for: Nintendo Switch (2020), PlayStation 4 (2020)

Rogue Squadron
Star Wars: Rogue Squadron (1998) Windows, Nintendo 64
Star Wars Rogue Squadron II: Rogue Leader (2001) GameCube
Star Wars Rogue Squadron III: Rebel Strike (2003) GameCube

Racer
Star Wars Episode I: Racer (1999) – Windows, Mac, Dreamcast, Nintendo 64, Game Boy Color
Re-released for: Nintendo Switch (2020), PlayStation 4 (2020), Xbox One (2020)
Star Wars: Racer Arcade (2000) – Arcade
Star Wars Racer Revenge (2002) – PlayStation 2
Re-released for: PlayStation Store (2015), PlayStation 4 (2019)

Galactic Battlegrounds 
Star Wars: Galactic Battlegrounds (2001) Windows, Mac
Expansion(s): Star Wars: Galactic Battlegrounds: Clone Campaigns (2002) Windows, Mac

Starfighter
Star Wars: Starfighter (2001) PlayStation 2, Xbox, Windows, Arcade
Star Wars: Starfighter Special Edition (2001) Xbox
Star Wars: Starfighter (2003) Arcade
Star Wars: Jedi Starfighter (2002) PlayStation 2, Xbox

Knights of the Old Republic
Star Wars: Knights of the Old Republic (2003) Windows, Xbox, Mac, iOS, Android
Re-released for: Nintendo Switch (2021)
Star Wars: Knights of the Old Republic II: The Sith Lords (2004) Windows, Linux (SteamOS), Xbox, Mac, Android
Re-released for: Nintendo Switch (2022)
Star Wars: The Old Republic (2011) (MMORPG) Windows
 Expansion(s): Rise of the Hutt Cartel (2013), Galactic Starfighter (2014), Galactic Strongholds (2014), Shadow of Revan (2014), Knights of the Fallen Empire (2015), Knights of the Eternal Throne (2016), Onslaught (2019) and Legacy of the Sith (2022)
Star Wars: Knights of the Old Republic — Remake (TBA) Windows, PlayStation 5

Galaxies
Star Wars Galaxies: An Empire Divided (2003) Windows (Shutdown)
Expansion(s): Star Wars Galaxies: Jump to Lightspeed (2004), Star Wars Galaxies: Episode III Rage of the Wookiees (2005), Star Wars Galaxies: Trials of Obi-Wan (2005), 
Compilation(s): Star Wars Galaxies: Starter Kit (2005), Star Wars Galaxies: The Total Experience (2005), and Star Wars Galaxies: The Complete Online Adventures (2006)

Battlefront
The Battlefront series has been handled by four different developers.

Pandemic Studios
Star Wars: Battlefront (2004) – PlayStation 2, Windows, Xbox, Mac, Mobile Phone
Star Wars: Battlefront II (2005) – PlayStation 2, Windows, Xbox, PlayStation Portable

Rebellion Developments
Star Wars Battlefront: Renegade Squadron (2007) – PlayStation Portable
Star Wars Battlefront: Elite Squadron (2009) – PlayStation Portable, Nintendo DS

THQ Interactive
Star Wars Battlefront: Mobile Squadrons (2009) – Mobile Phone

EA DICE
Star Wars Battlefront (2015) – PlayStation 4, Windows, Xbox One
Star Wars Battlefront II (2017) – PlayStation 4, Windows, Xbox One

Empire at War
Star Wars: Empire at War (2006) Windows, Mac OS X
Expansion(s): Star Wars: Empire at War: Forces of Corruption  (2006) Windows
Compilation: Star Wars: Empire at War: Gold Pack (game and expansion package) (2007) Windows

The Force Unleashed
Star Wars: The Force Unleashed (2008) Windows, Mac OS, Xbox 360, PlayStation 3, PlayStation 2, PlayStation Portable, Wii, Nintendo DS, iOS, N-Gage (service)
Star Wars: The Force Unleashed – Ultimate Sith Edition (2009) Windows, Mac OS, Xbox 360, PlayStation 3
Star Wars: The Force Unleashed II (2010) Windows, Xbox 360, PlayStation 3, Wii, Nintendo DS, iOS

The Clone Wars
Star Wars: The Clone Wars – Lightsaber Duels (2008) – Wii
Star Wars: The Clone Wars – Jedi Alliance (2008) – Nintendo DS
Star Wars: The Clone Wars – Republic Heroes (2009) – Windows, Xbox 360, PlayStation 3, PlayStation 2, PlayStation Portable, Wii, Nintendo DS
Clone Wars Adventures (2010) – Windows, Mac (Shutdown)

Jedi
Star Wars Jedi: Fallen Order (2019) – Windows, PlayStation 4, Xbox One, Stadia, PlayStation 5, Xbox Series X/S
Star Wars Jedi: Survivor (2023) – Windows, PlayStation 5, Xbox Series X/S

Stand-alone titles
The following is a list of stand-alone Star Wars games that do not form part of a series, released primarily for consoles, personal computers, handhelds and arcade. The titles are grouped together depending on the decade in which they were released.

1980s

Star Wars: Jedi Arena (1983) – Atari 2600
Ewoks - Wicket and the Dandelion Warriors (1987) - MSX
Star Wars: Droids (1988) – Amstrad CPC, ZX Spectrum

1990s
Star Wars: Shadows of the Empire (1996) – Nintendo 64, Windows
Star Wars: Masters of Teräs Käsi (1997) – PlayStation
Star Wars: Yoda Stories (1997) – Windows
Re-released for: Game Boy Color (1999)
Star Wars: Rebellion (Star Wars: Supremacy – UK) (1998) – Windows
Star Wars Trilogy Arcade (1998) – Arcade 
Star Wars Millennium Falcon CD-Rom Playset (1998) – Windows

2000s
Star Wars: Force Commander (2000) – Windows
Star Wars: Demolition (2000) – PlayStation, Dreamcast
Star Wars: Super Bombad Racing (2001) – PlayStation 2
Star Wars: Bounty Hunter (2002) – GameCube, PlayStation 2
Re-released for: PlayStation 3 (2015), PlayStation 4 (2019)
Star Wars: Flight of the Falcon (2003) – Game Boy Advance
Star Wars Trilogy: Apprentice of the Force (2004) – Game Boy Advance
Star Wars: Republic Commando (2005) – Xbox, Windows
 Re-released for: Nintendo Switch (2021), PlayStation 4 (2021)
Star Wars: Lethal Alliance (2006) – PlayStation Portable, Nintendo DS

2010s
Star Wars Battle Pod (2014) – Arcade

2020s
Star Wars: Squadrons (2020) – Windows, PlayStation 4, Xbox One
Star Wars: Hunters (2023) – Nintendo Switch, iOS, Android
Star Wars: Eclipse (TBA)

Games by genre
The following games are grouped together because they share the same genre, rather than because they are officially part of the same series. Excluded are the games listed above.

Table games
Star Wars Chess (1993) – DOS, Sega CD, Windows
Monopoly Star Wars (1997) – Windows

Pinball

Physical pinball
The Empire Strikes Back by Hankin (1980)
Star Wars by Data East (1992)
Star Wars Original Trilogy by Sega Pinball (1997)
Star Wars Episode I by Williams (1999)
Star Wars by Stern Pinball (2017)
Star Wars The Pin by Stern Pinball (2019)

Virtual pinball

Star Wars Pinball (2013) Windows, Mac, Wii U, Xbox 360, 3DS, PSVita, PlayStation 3, PlayStation 4, Kindle Fire, Android, iOS
Star Wars Episode V: The Empire Strikes Back (2013)
Star Wars: The Clone Wars (2013)
Star Wars Pinball: Boba Fett

Star Wars Pinball: Balance of the Force (2013) Xbox 360, PSVita, PlayStation 3, PlayStation 4, Android, iOS
Star Wars Episode VI: Return of the Jedi (2013)
Star Wars Pinball: Darth Vader
Star Wars Pinball: Starfighter Assault

Star Wars Pinball: Heroes Within (2014) Xbox 360, PSVita, PS3, PS4, Android, iOS
Star Wars Pinball: Masters of the Force
Star Wars Episode IV: A New Hope (2013)
Star Wars Pinball: Droids
Star Wars Pinball: Han Solo

Star Wars Pinball: Star Wars Rebels (2015)

Star Wars Pinball: The Force Awakens (2016)
 Star Wars Pinball: Star Wars: Resistance
 Star Wars Pinball: Might of the First Order

Star Wars Pinball: Rogue One (2017)

Star Wars Pinball: The Last Jedi (2018)
 Star Wars Pinball: Ahch-To Island
 Star Wars Pinball: The Last Jedi - Survive

Star Wars Pinball: Solo Pack (2018)
 Star Wars Pinball: Solo
 Star Wars Pinball: Calrissian Chronicles
 Star Wars Pinball: Battle of Mimban

A twentieth pinball table, based on the first season of The Mandalorian, was announced to be in development in late October of 2020 and due for a spring 2021 release.

Educational

Developed by Lucas Learning:

Star Wars: Yoda's Challenge
Star Wars: The Gungan Frontier
Star Wars: Droid Works (1999) Windows, Mac
Star Wars: Pit Droids Windows, iOS
Star Wars Math: Jabba's Game Galaxy (Developed by Argonaut Games)
Star Wars: JarJar's Journey Adventure Book
Star Wars: Anakin's Speedway
Star Wars: Early Learning Activity Center

Other educational:
Star Wars: Jedi Math (2008) (Educational) Leapster
Star Wars: Jedi Reading (2008) (Educational) Leapster
Star Wars: The Clone Wars (2008) (Platform/Educational) Didj
Star Wars: Jedi Trials (2009) Didj

Jakks Pacific- Plug It In & Play TV Games
Star Wars: Lightsaber Battle Game (2005) Handheld TV game
Star Wars: Revenge of the Sith (2005) – Jakks Pacific TV Game
Star Wars GameKey (expansion) (2006)
Star Wars: Original Trilogy (2007) Jakks Pacific TV Game
Star Wars: Republic Squadron (2009) Jakks Pacific TV Game

Non-video game PC software
Star Wars Screen Entertainment (1994) (Screensaver) – Windows
Star Wars: Behind the Magic (1998) (CD-ROM encyclopedia) – Windows, Macintosh

Kinect Motion Sensor
Kinect Star Wars (2012) (Kinect) Xbox 360

Virtual reality titles
Vader Immortal (2019) – Oculus Rift, Oculus Quest, PlayStation VR
Star Wars: Tales from the Galaxy's Edge (2020) – Oculus Quest
Star Wars: Tales from the Galaxy's Edge – Last Call (2021) – Oculus Quest
Star Wars: Tales from the Galaxy's Edge - Enhanced Edition (2023) – PlayStation VR2

Mobile titles
The following is a list of Star Wars titles that are only for mobile operating systems.

Star Wars: Battle For The Republic (2005) – Mobile Phone
Star Wars: Grievous Getaway (2005) – Mobile Phone
Star Wars: Battle Above Coruscant (2005) – Mobile Phone
Star Wars: Republic Commando: Order 66 (2005) – Mobile Phone
Star Wars: Lightsaber Combat (2005) – Mobile Phone
Star Wars Trivia (2005) – Mobile Phone
Star Wars: Ask Yoda (2005) – Mobile Phone
Star Wars: Puzzle Blaster (2005) – Mobile Phone
Star Wars: Jedi Assassin (2005) – Mobile Phone
Star Wars Imperial Ace 3D (2006) – Mobile Phone
Star Wars Cantina (2010) – iOS
Star Wars: Trench Run (2009) – iOS
Star Wars Battle of Hoth (2010) – iOS, Windows Phone
Star Wars Arcade: Falcon Gunner (2010) – iOS
Star Wars: Imperial Academy (2011) – iOS
Star Wars: Force Collection (2013) – Android, iOS
Star Wars: Tiny Death Star (2013) – Android, iOS, Windows Phone
Star Wars: Assault Team (2014) – Android, iOS, Windows Phone
Star Wars: Commander (2014) – Android, iOS, Windows Phone
Star Wars: Galactic Defense (2014) – Android, iOS
Star Wars Journeys: The Phantom Menace (2014) – iOS
Star Wars Journeys: Beginnings (2014) – iOS
Star Wars: Galaxy of Heroes (2015) – Android, iOS
Star Wars: Uprising (2015) – Android, iOS
Star Wars: Heroes Path (2015) – iOS
Star Wars Rebels: Recon Missions (2015) – Android, iOS, Windows Phone
Star Wars: Card Trader (2015) – Android, iOS
Star Wars: Force Arena (2017) – Android, iOS
Star Wars: Puzzle Droids (2017) – Android, iOS
Star Wars: Jedi Challenges (2017) – Android, iOS

Browser games
StarWars.com
Carbon Connection
Force Flight
Garbage Masher
Sharpshooter Clone Training (2008)
Live Fire (2008)
Clones vs. Droids
Ewok Village
Planetary Forces

Disney.com
Star Wars Rebels: Ghost Raid – StarWars.com, Disney.com (2014)
Star Wars Rebels: Rebel Strike – Disney.com (2014)

Crossovers
In some cases, Lucasfilm has allowed other video game franchises to do their own Star Wars games, resulting in crossover hybrid franchises.

Lego Star Wars
Lego made video games based on their Lego Star Wars toys, as part of their Lego video games franchise.

Lego main series
Lego Star Wars: The Video Game (2005): Windows, Mac, PlayStation 2, Xbox, GameCube, Game Boy Advance
Lego Star Wars II: The Original Trilogy (2006): Windows, Mac, PlayStation 2, PlayStation Portable, Xbox 360, Xbox, GameCube, Game Boy Advance
Compilation(s): Lego Star Wars: The Complete Saga (2007) includes Lego Star Wars: The Video Game, and Lego Star Wars II: The Original Trilogy. Windows, Mac, Xbox 360, PlayStation 3, Wii, Nintendo DS, iOS, Android
Lego Star Wars III: The Clone Wars (2011): Windows, Mac, Xbox 360, PlayStation 3, PlayStation Portable, 3DS, Wii, Nintendo DS
Lego Star Wars: The Force Awakens (2016): Windows, Mac, PlayStation 4, PlayStation 3, Playstation Vita, Xbox One, Xbox 360, Wii U, Nintendo 3DS, iOS
Lego Star Wars: The Skywalker Saga (2022): Windows, PlayStation 4, PlayStation 5, Xbox One, Xbox Series X, Nintendo Switch

Mobile game and web browser
Lego Star Wars: The Quest for R2-D2 (2009): Unity
Lego Star Wars: Ace Assault (2011) – Windows
Lego Star Wars: Ace Assault 2 (2012) – Windows
Lego Star Wars: Battle Orders (2012) – Unity
Lego Star Wars: The Yoda Chronicles (2013) – Android, iOS
Lego Star Wars: The New Yoda Chronicles (2014) – Android, iOS
Lego Star Wars: Microfighters (2014) – Android, iOS
Lego Star Wars: Battles (2021) – Apple Arcade
Lego Star Wars: Castaways (2021) – Apple Arcade

Lego Indiana Jones

 Lego Indiana Jones: The Original Adventures (2008), LucasArts – Action-adventure game featuring unlockable Han Solo and cameos from other Star Wars characters. Wii, Nintendo DS, Xbox 360, PlayStation 3, PlayStation 2, PlayStation Portable, Windows
 Lego Indiana Jones 2: The Adventure Continues (2009), LucasArts – Action-adventure game featuring cameos from Star Wars characters. Wii, Nintendo DS, Xbox 360, PlayStation 3, PlayStation Portable, Windows

Angry Birds Star Wars
Angry Birds Star Wars (2012)
Angry Birds Star Wars II (2013)

Roblox 

 Star Wars (2014-2019): Windows, Xbox One, Xbox One S, IOS, Android, Oculus Rift (VR) - Sponsors and events for Star Wars Rebels, Rogue One, The Last Jedi, Solo, and The Rise of Skywalker, which contained objectives with in-game virtual prizes (accessories and gears) attached to the events’ respective games, as well as free items in the Catalog (currently known as the Avatar Shop) for 1 ticket or for free.

List of sponsors:
 Star Wars Rebels: Season One (2014)
 Star Wars Rebels: Season Two (2015)

List of events:
 Universe (2016) - Sponsored by Rogue One: A Star Wars Story
 Space Battle (2017) - Sponsored by Star Wars: The Last Jedi
 Battle Arena (2018) - Sponsored by Solo: A Star Wars Story
 Galactic Speedway Creator Challenge (2019) - Sponsored by Star Wars: The Rise of Skywalker

Additional notes:
 Besides the main events, a Disney XD crossover event known as Summer Camp (2015) included a virtual prize of the Star Wars: Rebels character, Chopper, in the form of a tiny shoulder pal.
 The event also included promotional billboards of the Star Wars: Rebels TV series in the maps of the events’ respective games.
 Similarly to Summer Camp (2015), Disney Infinity 3.0 was also featured as a sponsored event in 2015, and had the maps decorated in the games that were part of the event that included promotional billboards that featured the characters Princess Leia, Darth Vader, Yoda, Anakin Skywalker and Sabine Wren.
 While the characters were advertised in billboards in the events’ respective games, none of the actual virtual prizes or free items tied directly into any Star Wars media.
 As part of the sponsor, Star Wars Rebels: Season Two not only included free items, but was also featured on the promotional material of the billboards in the maps of two pre-existing games on the platform, and also included the limited-time branding on the games’ respective thumbnails.

Disney Infinity
The Disney Infinity series allowed the use of Star Wars characters alongside characters from other franchises owned by Disney, including characters from the Marvel and Pixar films.
Disney Infinity 3.0 (2015):  Microsoft Windows, PlayStation 3, PlayStation 4, Xbox 360, Xbox One, Wii U, iOS, Android

Disney Magic Kingdoms 
The world builder game Disney Magic Kingdoms includes an area based on Star Wars: Galaxy's Edge (included in 2019), along with several playable characters from Star Wars, as well as some attractions based on locations and vehicles from the franchise.

The Sims
 The Sims 4: Journey to Batuu (2020): Microsoft Windows, Mac, PlayStation 4, Xbox One - Ninth game pack for The Sims 4. Adds a new destination world called Batuu with a Star Wars-style storyline. Adds new types of aliens and other Star Wars-inspired outfits, objects and characters.

Minecraft 
 Star Wars (2020): Windows, PlayStation 4, Xbox One, Nintendo Switch, Amazon Kindle Fire, Amazon Fire TV, IOS, Android, Oculus Rift, Gear VR - DLC for Minecraft: Bedrock Edition purchasable through the Minecraft Market place. Adds Star Wars maps, quests, mobs, skins, items and vehicles from the Original Trilogy and The Mandalorian into the game.

Cultural impact

This category refers to video games from other franchises where the inclusion of Star Wars characters is very minor and restricted only to small Easter eggs or unlockable character cameos.

Night Shift (1990) – Platform game featuring action figures of various Star Wars characters. Amiga, Atari ST, Commodore 64, Mac, PC, Amstrad CPC, ZX Spectrum
Tony Hawk's Pro Skater series:
 Tony Hawk's Pro Skater 3 (2001) – Skateboarding game featuring unlockable Darth Maul. Nintendo GameCube, Xbox, PlayStation 2, PC
 Tony Hawk's Pro Skater 4 (2002) – Skateboarding game featuring unlockable Jango Fett. Nintendo GameCube, Xbox, PlayStation 2, PC
 Secret Weapons Over Normandy (2003) – Flight simulation game featuring unlockable X-wing and TIE Fighter. Xbox, PlayStation 2, PC
 Mercenaries: Playground of Destruction (2005) – Features unlockable character Han Solo. Xbox, PlayStation 2
Soulcalibur IV (2008) – Fighting game. At release featuring Darth Vader exclusively in the PlayStation 3 version, with Yoda exclusively in the Xbox 360 version, and Darth Vader's apprentice Galen Starkiller Marek in both versions. Months after the release, Darth Vader and Yoda were made available for purchase as downloadable content, each at the version they were absent at release. Each of the Star Wars characters had his own ending on the "Story Mode". However, in late 2016, all DLC in Soulcalibur IV was removed from the PlayStation and Microsoft stores due to licensing from the purchase of Star Wars by Disney.
Indiana Jones and the Staff of Kings (2009) – Action-adventure game featuring unlockable Han Solo. Wii, PlayStation 2, Nintendo DS, PlayStation Portable

Canceled games
Games that were never finished, nor released.

Star Wars: Return of the Jedi – Ewok Adventure (1983) – Atari 2600 
Proteus (MMORPG) - Console
Star Wars Episode VII: Shadows of the Sith
Star Wars: Imperial Commando (FPS)
Star Wars: Smuggler – Cross-platform
Vernost – Windows
Star Wars: Jedi Knight III: Brink of Darkness
Star Wars: Battlefront III (2008) (First/third-person shooter) – PlayStation 3, Windows, Xbox 360
Star Wars: Battlefront IV (First/third-person shooter)
Shadow of the Sith
Star Wars: First Assault (2012) (First-person shooter)
Star Wars: Knights of the Old Republic III – Windows, Xbox
Star Wars 1313 (2013) (Action-adventure) – Windows, PlayStation 4, Xbox One
Star Wars Outpost (2013)
Star Wars: Attack Squadrons (2014) – Browser
Star Wars Scene Maker: Rebels (2015) – iOS
Battle of the Sith Lords (2015) (Action-adventure) – Windows, Xbox 360, PlayStation 3, Wii U
Star Wars: The Force Unleashed III (Action-adventure) – Windows, Wii U, Xbox One, PlayStation 4
Project Ragtag – Windows, Xbox One, PlayStation 4
Star Wars Rivals – Mobile
Star Wars: Rise to Power – Android

References

Star Wars video games
List of LucasArts Star Wars games
 List of Star Wars video games
Video games
Star Wars video games